The Paratech P25 is a Swiss single-place paraglider that was designed by Uwe Bernholz and produced by Paratech of Appenzell. It is now out of production.

Design and development
The aircraft was designed as a beginner/intermediate glider.

Variants
P25S
Small-sized model for lighter pilots. The glider model is DHV 1-2 certified.
P25M
Mid-sized model for medium-weight pilots. The glider model is DHV 1 certified.
P25L
Large-sized model for heavier pilots. The glider model is DHV 1 certified.

Specifications (P25M)

References

P25
Paragliders